The United States competed at the 1952 Winter Olympics in Oslo, Norway.

Medalists 

The following U.S. competitors won medals at the games. In the by discipline sections below, medalists' names are bolded. 

| width="78%" align="left" valign="top" |

| width=22% align=left valign=top |

Alpine skiing

Men

Women

Bobsleigh

Cross-country skiing

Figure skating

Individual

Mixed

Ice hockey

The tournament was run in a round-robin format with nine teams participating.

Summary

Roster

Tournament

Norway 2-3 USA
USA 8-2 Germany FR
USA 8-2 Finland
USA 8-2 Switzerland
Sweden 4-2 USA
USA 5-3 Poland
USA 6-3 Czechoslovakia
Canada 3-3 USA

Nordic combined 

The cross-country skiing part of this event was combined with the main medal event, meaning that athletes competing here were skiing for two disciplines at the same time. Details can be found above in this article, in the cross-country skiing section.

The ski jumping (normal hill) event was held separate from the main medal event of ski jumping, results can be found in the table below (athletes were allowed to perform three jumps, the best two jumps were counted and are shown here).

Ski jumping

Speed skating

References

 Olympic Winter Games 1952, full results by sports-reference.com

Nations at the 1952 Winter Olympics
1952
Olympics